Bellamy Young (born Amy Maria Young; February 19, 1970) is an American actress, producer and singer, best known for her role as Melody "Mellie" Grant in the ABC drama series Scandal (2012–2018). In 2014 for her portrayal of Mellie, she won the Critics' Choice Television Award for Best Supporting Actress in a Drama Series. She also starred in the Fox series Prodigal Son (2019–2021).

Early life 
Young was born as Amy Maria Young in Asheville, North Carolina, and was adopted. She changed her name to join the Screen Actors Guild since there was another Amy Young registered, and chose the name Bellamy as a tribute to her late father's best friend, Bill, who had helped to raise her after her father died.

Young graduated from Asheville School in 1987. She attended Yale University, initially majoring in physics but studying English and theatre, and graduated in 1991. She spent a summer during college at the British American Drama Academy in England.

Career

1995–2011
Young began her acting career in theatre. In 1997, she made her Broadway debut as Mary in the original cast of The Life. She has also appeared Off-Broadway in Stephen Sondheim's musical Merrily We Roll Along (1994), and Randy Newman's Faust (1995–1996). In 1995, she made her television debut in a recurring role on the NBC daytime soap opera Another World as Dr. Courtney Evans. She guest-starred on Law & Order in 1997 and 1998, in two different roles. In 1999 she made her film debut with a small role in the crime drama Black and White and later co-starred in several independent films. In the early 2000s she began appearing in guest-starring roles on a number of television dramas and comedies, including The Drew Carey Show, The X Files, ER, Frasier, The West Wing, NCIS, Medium, Grey's Anatomy, Private Practice, Two and a Half Men, Supernatural, Drop Dead Diva, and Castle. From 2000 to 2011, Young made over 30 guest appearances on television shows.

Young was a regular cast member in the USA Network series Peacemakers in 2003. The show was cancelled after one season of nine episodes. She had recurring roles in the Lifetime legal drama series For the People as Deputy Dist. Atty. Agnes Hunt in 2002, on NBC period drama American Dreams as Diane Shaw in 2003, on NBC's Scrubs as Dr. Grace Miller in 2004, as Assistant State Attorney Monica West on CBS's CSI: Miami (2005–06), and on ABC primetime soap opera Dirty Sexy Money (2008–2009) as Ellen Darling, the eldest daughter-in-law of the Darling family. She also had a recurring role in Criminal Minds as Beth Clemmons from 2011 to 2013.

Young has appeared in supporting roles in a number of films, including We Were Soldiers (2002) and Mission: Impossible III (2006), along with independent movies like Larceny (2004), Eve of Understanding (2006), Trust Me (2007), This Is Not a Test (2008), In My Sleep (2010), The Freebie (2010), and Joint Body (2014).

2012–present 
In 2011 Shonda Rhimes cast Young in the recurring role of First Lady, then 2016 Republican presidential nominee, Melody "Mellie" Grant on the ABC political thriller television series Scandal opposite Kerry Washington and Tony Goldwyn. Before Scandal, Young appeared in Shonda Rhimes' Grey's Anatomy and Private Practice. She appeared in every episode of the first season of Scandal and was upgraded to a series regular in season two. She later said that her part was originally conceived as a three episode arc. Young has received critical acclaim for her performance as Melody Grant throughout her time on the show . The Daily Beast named her the "Breakout Star" of the show in 2014. Many critics praised Young's performance in her character's centered episode "Everything's Coming Up Mellie" of the third season. Cicely K. Dyson's review for The Wall Street Journal states: "Bellamy Young has been an amazing scene stealer for two-and-a-half seasons, and this time she finally got her chance to shine." Robert Rorke, writing for The New York Post states, "In Mellie, the show has its most fleshed-out character and in Young, its most compelling performer."  She won a Critics' Choice Television Award for Best Supporting Actress in a Drama Series for her performance in season three.

On May 15, 2015, Young released her first album, Far Away So Close, on iTunes.  In 2016, she starred in the crime drama film The Night Stalker directed by Megan Griffiths about the serial killer Richard Ramirez. The following year, she had a supporting role in the  independent comedy film Bernard and Huey opposite Jim Rash and David Koechner. In 2018, she co-starred in Disney's live action adaptation of A Wrinkle in Time, along with Oprah Winfrey, Reese Witherspoon, and Mindy Kaling. Also that year, she played a leading role in the ABC comedy-drama pilot False Profits.

In March 2019, Young announced that she would be co-starring in the Fox drama pilot Prodigal Son opposite Michael Sheen, Lou Diamond Phillips, and Tom Payne. In May, the show was green-lit for a series order and by October, had been picked up for a full 22-episode season order . Prodigal Son was the first full season order of fall 2019 and was the highest-rated new show on any network. Young guest-starred in the ABC crime drama Whiskey Cavalier and Netflix anthology Dolly Parton's Heartstrings in 2019. In 2021, she guest-starred in the first episode of Fox series, Fantasy Island and starred in the CW reboot of The Waltons' Homecoming playing the role of Olivia Walton.

In 2022, Young starred in the ABC family drama series, Promised Land playing villainous Margaret Honeycroft. The series was canceled after one season. She returned to role of Olivia Walton in The Waltons' Thanksgiving later in 2022. Later in 2022, she was cast in the Hulu adaptation of The Other Black Girl.

Personal life
Young has been vegan since 1988 and in 2016 participated in a campaign for PETA titled, "Being Vegan Keeps Me Young". A long time supporter of shelter adoption, Young starred in 2 televised adverts for The Humane Society of the United States: 'The Shelter Pet Project' in 2015 and 'Honestly' in 2016.

Young is a registered Democrat. Along with several of her Scandal cast mates, Young headlined at a fundraiser event for Hillary Clinton in April 2016. From August through November 2016, Young hit the campaign trail for Clinton and visited Virginia, North Carolina, Colorado, Iowa, Michigan, Ohio, Pennsylvania, and New Hampshire. As part of the Obama administration legacy, in 2016, Young appeared in 'Women Film' by The United States of Women along with several other public figures such as Michelle Obama, Meryl Streep and Oprah Winfrey. After performing at the 2015 National Christmas Tree Lighting, it was announced that in 2016 Young would be co-ambassador, along with Chelsea Clinton, of the Trust for the National Mall.

Young is the honorary chair for the domestic violence nonprofit organization 'Helpmate' and has helped raise funds for victims of domestic violence. In 2015, she won Celebrity Jeopardy! and as a result won $50,000 for Operation Blankets of Love–a charity which donates blankets to animals in shelters. As a teenager, she began to suffer from migraines and still suffers from them to this day. She became a partner with GlaxoSmithKline for Treximet, in 2015, to spread migraine awareness. Young partnered with Merck & Co., in November 2016, to help educate people on the importance of biomarker testing in non-small cell lung cancer, the disease that killed her father.

A scholarship student herself, Young now endows a scholarship each year to a student at her alma mater, Yale University. In 2019, she became an ambassador for the organization CARE and went on a trip to Rwanda to see the work they are doing there. For International Women's Day 2020, Young directed a PSA, for CARE; she appears as well as Kerry Washington, Shonda Rhimes, and Katie Lowes.

Young began dating Portuguese percussionist Pedro Segundo, nineteen years her junior,  in September 2017. In September 2022, Young revealed she and Segundo married during the COVID-19 pandemic.

Filmography

Film

Television

Theatre

References

External links

 
 
 

1970 births
American expatriate actresses in the United Kingdom
American film actresses
American television actresses
Living people
Actresses from North Carolina
Musicians from Asheville, North Carolina
North Carolina Democrats
Asheville School alumni
Yale College alumni
American soap opera actresses
20th-century American actresses
21st-century American actresses
American stage actresses
Alumni of the University of Oxford
American adoptees
Alumni of the British American Drama Academy